Park Byeong-jin (born 10 January 1966) is a South Korean boxer. He competed in the men's light heavyweight event at the 1988 Summer Olympics.

References

1966 births
Living people
South Korean male boxers
Olympic boxers of South Korea
Boxers at the 1988 Summer Olympics
Place of birth missing (living people)
Light-heavyweight boxers